Lisduff is a townland in County Cork, Ireland.  Historical records list Lisduffe from the Down Survey dated 1655.  The Record of Monuments and Places contains two entries in the Lisduff area; a millstone and a ringfort.

Ringfort
The ringfort is described as a circular area approximately 34 meters in diameter defined by a 1.7 meter scarp with the interior rising towards centre.  Damage to the southwest portion can be viewed from satellite imagery.

References

Townlands of County Cork